The Mao Zedong Statue is located in Wuyi Square, Fuzhou, Fujian, China. The monument stands 10.1 m (33.1365 ft) tall and depicts Mao Zedong with an outstretched arm. The statue was built by Yang Zhengrong, a painter in Fujian, beginning in 1969; it was completed after a year and a half.

References

Buildings and structures in Fuzhou
Statues of Mao Zedong
Monuments and memorials in China
Outdoor sculptures in China
1969 establishments in China